Dadju Djuna Nsungula (born 2 May 1991), better known by the mononym Dadju or at times Prince Dadj, is a  French singer. He was signed to the label Wati B and in 2017 signed with Polydor Records of Universal Music Group. He was a member of the musical formation Shin Sekaï alongside rapper Abou Tall from 2012 to 2016. The duo was part of the label Wati B and released the album Indéfini. The duo announced that they were breaking up so they can each follow solo careers. Dadju released his solo album Gentleman 2.0 in 2017.

Personal life
Dadju comes from a musical family. His father is  Djanana Djuna, a Congolese vocalist of Papa Wemba's band. His half-brother is Gims, a famous solo rapper and ex-member of the successful French rap group Sexion d'Assaut, a major act under the music label Wati B. His other brothers Bedjik and Xgangs are also rappers in their own right.

In 2016, he got married and had a daughter a few months later. He welcomed a baby boy in 2020.

Discography

Albums
as part of Shin Sekaï
2013: The Shin Sekaï Vol. I (mixtape)
2014: Volume II (mixtape)
2016: Indéfini

Solo

Singles

*Did not appear in the official Belgian Ultratop 50 charts, but rather in the bubbling under Ultratip charts

Featured in

*Did not appear in the official Belgian Ultratop 50 charts, but rather in the bubbling under Ultratip charts

Other charted songs

References

External links
Official website

1991 births
Living people
People from Bobigny
French people of Democratic Republic of the Congo descent
21st-century French singers
21st-century French male singers
Black French musicians